"Chinese Food" is a song by Alison Gold. It was released on October 5, 2013 as her debut single by PMW Live. It entered the Billboard Hot 100 singles chart at number 29, selling 1,000 downloads and being streamed on YouTube five million times for the week ending October 20, 2013. As of October 20, 2013, it had not been reported to be played on any radio stations in the United States. The video was removed by the song's producer, Patrice Wilson, from his channel in 2018, although he has since re-uploaded it.

Background
Patrice Wilson wrote the song on his birthday in 2012.  Wilson, explaining his inspiration for writing the song, stating: "There's a restaurant I go to, they have chicken wings, they have beef with broccoli, that's what I love. The song is based on my experience—what I know about Chinese food."

Music video
The music video for "Chinese Food" was released on October 14, 2013. It was filmed partly in a Mongolian restaurant, because a Chinese restaurant could not be booked, while some other scenes were shot in Gold's bedroom. It was viewed almost one million times within 24 hours of being uploaded to the video sharing site YouTube, attaining an estimated 4:1 ratio of dislikes to likes and drawing comparisons to another poorly received Patrice Wilson production, "Friday" (2011) by Rebecca Black. Wilson himself appears in the "Chinese Food" video wearing a panda suit.

Reception and Controversy 
The video attracted controversy for its alleged overuse of Asian stereotypes, including scenes of Japanese geisha imagery in a Chinese-themed song. Another scene singled out by media outlets depicts Gold and Wilson playing the board game Monopoly, after which the camera zooms in on Wilson placing the dog figure on the square for Oriental Avenue. Devon Maloney of Wired wrote that the video "is not racist because it depicts pan-Asian cuisine; it's racist because it lazily traffics in racial stereotypes and paints over the distinctions between vastly different Asian cultures with the same 'it's all Chinese to me!' brush." Gold, in response to the accusations, stated: "I don't really understand what that's all about... I mean, I'm not trying to criticize anyone – I just really love Chinese food!" Wilson also denied any intentions of racism, responding:

Charts

References

2013 debut singles
2013 songs
Alison Gold songs
Viral videos
Dance-pop songs
Music video controversies
Songs written by Patrice Wilson
Stereotypes of East Asian people
Ethnic humour
Race-related controversies in music